Blue Love is a studio album by Greek singing duo Antique. The songs are mainly the English versions of the songs featured on Alli Mia Fora. The album was released in Scandinavia by Bonnier Music, and in Greece by V2 Records. It peaked on the Greek Foreign Albums Chart at number one. In June 2008, the album was reprinted and reissued by Bonnier Music.

To promote the album, a release party was organised at the restaurant Hamburger Börs in Sweden, which was styled as a Greek taverna for the event on 7 May 2003.

Track listing

Charts

References 

Antique (band) compilation albums
2003 compilation albums
Greek-language albums
V2 Records compilation albums